The 1895 World Championship was a football match that took place at Tynecastle Park on 27 April 1895 between the winner of the English Football League First Division, Sunderland, and Scottish League Division One, Heart of Midlothian. The match was won by Sunderland 
5–3.

The wealthy miner Samuel Tyzack, who alongside and shipbuilder Robert Turnbull funded the Sunderland side known as the "team of all talents," often pretended to be a priest while scouting for players in Scotland, as Sunderland's recruitment policy in Scotland enraged many Scottish fans. In fact, the Sunderland lineup in the 1895 World Championship consisted entirely of Scottish players - Scottish players who moved to England to play professionally in those days were nicknamed the Scotch Professors.

The game was not the first "World Championship" game between English and Scottish sides; and it was the second such club competition won by an English team, with previous winners being Aston Villa and Renton (both Scottish Cup and FA Cup winners, as the leagues had not been yet created at the time). The Scottish and English leagues were pre-eminent in the world at that time. However, it was the first ever game played between the respective champions of two different leagues.

This was the only international competition Sunderland won; they subsequently participated in the British League Cup in 1902 and the Empire Exhibition Trophy in 1938 but exited early in those competitions.

Participant teams

Match details

References 

1894–95 in English football
1894–95 in Scottish football
World Championship 1895
World Championship 1895
April 1895 sports events
International sports competitions hosted by Scotland
1890s in Edinburgh